Villa Heights is a Roanoke, Virginia neighborhood located in northwest Roanoke north of U.S. 460 (Melrose Avenue). It borders the neighborhoods of Washington Heights on the west, Melrose-Rugby on the east, Fairland, Miller Court/Arrowood and Westview Terrace on the north and Shenandoah West and South Washington Heights on the south. As of the 2000 U.S. Census, Villa Heights has a population of 2,840 residents.

History 
Originally subdivided in 1910 as one of Roanoke's early suburbs, the character of Villa Heights shifts from that of a traditional turn of the century neighborhood to that of typical suburban. Today, Villa Heights is the location of the Roanoke Country Club and Villa Heights Park.

Villa Heights Home
Elijah McClanahan built a home in 1820. "Built in 1820, the house was owned by Lt. Col. Elijah McClanahan, a War of 1812 veteran. The original Federal architecture was renovated in the early 20th century with Classical revival features on the interior and exterior and has been known as the Compton-Bateman house." This property was later to be known as part of the Villa Heights neighborhood in Roanoke, Virginia. Originally named "Long Meadow" by Col. McClanahan, over the years the name of the house was known as "Villa Heights", from which the neighborhood was named, to the Compton-Bateman house, as it is locally known today.

"The original dwelling of Villa Heights, built by Elijah McClanahan in 1820, was a comparatively modest Federal style house, compared to its 20th century evolution. However, it was still quite a substantial house for this area during the second quarter of the nineteenth century and, compared to most of the surrounding farmsteads of the time, would have been an iconic and impressive building. Character-defining features of its original Federal design included unpainted Flemish bond, load-bearing brick construction, a molded brick water table, and a five-bay facade with symmetrical fenestration and stone window sills. Today the façade also features Classical Revival detailing around the entry, notably a round-arched opening with a fanlight transom and
five-light sidelights, but it is undetermined as of yet if these were part of the original design or if they were added in a later alteration."

References

External links
 Fairland/Villa Heights Neighborhood Plan

Neighborhoods in Roanoke, Virginia
Houses in Roanoke, Virginia